Mai Okumura (奥村麻依, born October 31, 1990) is a Japanese volleyball player. She plays for the Japan women's national volleyball team. She competed at the 2020 Summer Olympics, in Women's volleyball,.

She competed at the 2019 FIVB Volleyball Nations League.

References 

Living people
Denso Airybees players
JT Marvelous players
Japanese women's volleyball players
Volleyball players at the 2020 Summer Olympics
1990 births
Olympic volleyball players of Japan